Amos Gager Throop (1811–1894) was an American  businessman and politician in Chicago, Illinois during the 1840s and 1850s. Most famously he was known for being a staunch abolitionist prior to the Civil War. He served as a Chicago alderman from the 4th Ward from 1849 through 1853. In Chicago, he lost two campaigns to be that city's mayor in 1852 and 1854. In both elections he was the nominee of the little-known Temperance Party, facing tough opposition from the Democratic Party. At the time of the Great Chicago Fire Throop was the City Treasurer of Chicago. He was instrumental in securing financing from New York to rebuild the wooden frontier town into a city of brick and mortar. Grateful Chicagoans renamed Main Street to Throop Street. Many years later and after moving to California, he was finally elected mayor—of Pasadena, California in 1888.

A fervent adherent to a liberal religion, Throop established a Universalist group in Pasadena in 1886: the church still survives as Throop Unitarian Universalist Church. He is now best known for founding in 1891 (with a gift of over $100,000) the California Institute of Technology, which is today one of the world's most selective universities. In fact, it was known through its first thirty years as Throop University, Throop Polytechnic Institute, and Throop College of Technology, before its administrators decided on its current name which took effect in 1920. Also part of the Throop Polytechnic Institute was Polytechnic School which separated from the Institute in 1907.  It is currently a private college preparatory school across the street from Caltech with grades ranging from K-12. His motto was "learn by doing".

The scenic Throop Peak ., known for its 360-degree views stretching from the Mojave Desert all the way to the Pacific Ocean, sits on the Pacific Crest Trail and is also named after Mr. Throop. Another landmark named after him is Throop Unitarian Universalist Church, a Pasadena Unitarian Universalist congregation founded in 1923. Throop Street at 1300 West in Chicago also is named for him.

He was allegedly a descendant of Sir Adrian Scrope, the famous regicide, possibly of the English Scrope family. Amos Gager Throop's daughter, Martha married John C. Vaughan, founder of The Vaughan Seed Company.

References

External links
THE AMOS GAGER THROOP COLLECTION A Guide to the Papers in The Archives of The California Institute of Technology and The Chicago Historical Society, 1990

1811 births
1894 deaths
California Institute of Technology people
American abolitionists
Chicago City Council members
Mayors of Pasadena, California
Members of the Universalist Church of America
19th-century Christian universalists
American temperance activists
19th-century American politicians
Activists from California
University and college founders